This is a list of edible plants in the family Cactaceae.

 Acanthocereus tetragonus, the sword pear,
 Browningia candelaris,
 Carnegiea gigantea, the Saguaro,
 Cereus repandus - California and Florida
 genus Corryocactus (also known as Erdisia), the tasty berrylike
 C. brevistylis, C. pulquiensis, and C. erectus
 Coryphantha
 C. robbinsorum and C. recurvata.
 genus Echinocereus ("Strawberry Cactus")
 E. engelmannii, E. bonkerae, E. boyce-thompsonii
 E. enneacanthus, E. cincerascens, E. stramineus
 E. dasyacanthus, E. fendleri and E. fasciculatus
 E. brandegeei, E. ledingii and E. nicholii
 E. engelmannii ("Strawberry Vanilla")
 genus Echinopsis
 South American species
 E. (or T.) atacamensis, E./T. coquimbana and E./T. schickendanzii
 genus Epiphyllum, the Orchid cactus
 E. anguliger (also called Phyllocactus darrahii, said to be like gooseberries)
 genus Epithelantha (the fruit of all species said to be edible)
 genus Eulychnia
 E. acida
 genus Ferocactus
 Ferocactus hamatacanthus
 F. histrix ("borrachitos") and F. latispinus ("pochas")
 genus Harrisia (of Florida and the Caribbean), the "Prickly Apples"
 Harrisia martinii
 NOTE: The following 5 are said to be "endangered endemic" :
  H. aboriginum, H.simpsonii, H. adscendens, H fragrans and H. eriophora
  H. pomanensis
 Argentinian H. balansae
 genus Mammillaria ("chilitos" as they look like tiny red chili peppers)
  M. applanata, M. meiacantha, M. macdougalii, M. lasiacantha
  M. grahamii, M. oliviae, M. mainiae, M. microcarpa, M. thornberi and many others
 Myrtillocactus geometrizans ("garambulos", taste like less-acid cranberries)

 genus Opuntia, the prickly pears
 Opuntia engelmannii
 Opuntia ficus-indica 
 Opuntia matudae
 Opuntia fragilis
 Opuntia basilaris
 genus Pachycereus, 
 Pachycereus pringlei, the Cardon
 P. schottii, the Senita and P. weberi, the Candelabro
 genus Peniocereus,
 Peniocereus greggii, the Arizona Queen of the Night
 P. johnstonii and P. serpentinus
 genus Pereskia
 P. aculeata, the "Barbados gooseberry"
 P. guamacho
 Genus Selenicereus
 S. undatus, S. megalanthus and other species ("dragon fruits")
 genus Stenocereus (quite sweet, but prone to ferment; hence the "agria" [="sour"]))
 S. fricii ("Pitayo de aguas"), S. griseus ("Pitayo de Mayo"), S. gummosus ("Pitahaya agria")
 S. pruinosus ("Pitayo de Octubre"), S. montanus ("Pitaya colorada")
 S. queretaroensis ("Pitaya de Queretaro"), S. standleyi ("Pita Marismena"), S. stellatus ("Xoconostle")
 S. thurberi ("Organ Pipe Cactus", "Pitayo Dulce") and S. treleasi ("Tunillo")

References 

'edible
'cacti